Ramon Berenguer II the Towhead or Cap de estopes (1053 or 1054 – December 5, 1082) was Count of Barcelona from  1076 until his death. He was the son of Ramon Berenguer I, Count of Barcelona, and Almodis de La Marche. The Chronicle of San Juan de la Pena called him, "… exceeding brave and bold, kind, pleasant, pious, joyful, generous, and of an attractive appearance". Because of the extremely thick hair he had on top of his head, he was known as Cap d'Estop."

He succeeded his father as co-ruler with his twin brother, Berenguer Ramon II in 1075. The twins failed to agree and divided their possessions between them, against the will of their late father. Ramon Berenguer the Towhead, so called because of the thickness and colour of his hair, was killed while hunting in the woods in 1082. His brother, who went on to become the sole ruler of Catalonia, was credited by popular opinion of having orchestrated this murder. Berenguer Ramon II the Fratricide was later succeeded by Ramon Berenguer's son, Ramon Berenguer III.

Family and issue 

Ramon Berenguer married Mahalta (or Maud) of Apulia, born ca. 1059, died 1111/1112, daughter of Duke Robert Guiscard and of Sikelgaita de Salerno. Following his murder, she remarried to Aimery I of Narbonne, and was the mother of his son Aimery II.

Ramon Berenguer and Mahalta's son, Ramon Berenguer III (before 1082–1131), was count of Barcelona and Provence.

References

Sources

  

 

Year of birth missing
1082 deaths
Ramon Berenguer 02
Assassinated Spanish people
11th-century murdered monarchs
Barcelona
House of Barcelona
11th-century people from the County of Barcelona